President Thiers Bank is a broad guyot, which lies northwest of Rapa and  southeast of Raivavae, in the Austral Islands. It may have been created by the Macdonald hotspot. Another theory sees in the seamount the endpoint of an alignment that starts with Aitutaki and also involves one volcanic phase at Raivavae.

References

Sources 

 

Seamounts of the Pacific Ocean
Undersea banks of the Pacific Ocean
Guyots
Geography of the Austral Islands